The Jupiter Award is a German annual cinema award. It is Germany's biggest audience award for cinema and TV and is awarded annually by Cinema magazine  and TV Spielfilm in eleven categories.  The Jupiter awards began  in 1979.

Ceremonies

1st Jupiter Award / 1979

2nd Jupiter Award / 1980

3rd Jupiter Award / 1981

4th Jupiter Award / 1982

5th Jupiter Award / 1983

6th Jupiter Award / 1984

7th Jupiter Award / 1985

8th Jupiter Award / 1986

9th Jupiter Award / 1987

10th Jupiter Award / 1988

11th Jupiter Award / 1989

12th Jupiter Award / 1990

13th Jupiter Award / 1991 
 Best International Film: Dead Poets Society, directed by Peter Weir
 Best International Director: Oliver Stone, for Born on the Fourth of July
 Best International Actor: Robin Williams, for Dead Poets Society
 Best International Actress: Julia Roberts, for Pretty Woman

14th Jupiter Award / 1992 
 Best International Film: Dances with Wolves, directed by Kevin Costner
 Best International Director: Kevin Costner, for Dances with Wolves
 Best International Actor: Kevin Costner, for Dances with Wolves / Robin Hood: Prince of Thieves
 Best International Actress: Jodie Foster, for The Silence of the Lambs

15th Jupiter Award / 1993 
 Best International Film: JFK, directed by Oliver Stone
 Best International Director: Oliver Stone, for JKF
 Best International Actor: Robert De Niro, for Cape Fear
 Best International Actress: Jodie Foster, for Little Man Tate

16th Jupiter Award / 1994 
 Best International Film: Jurassic Park, directed by Steven Spielberg
 Best International Director: Steven Spielberg, for Jurassic Park
 Best International Actor: Clint Eastwood, for In the Line of Fire
 Best International Actress: Winona Ryder, for The Age of Innocence / Dracula / The House of the Spirits

17th Jupiter Award / 1995 
 Best International Film: Schindler's List, directed by Steven Spielberg
 Best International Director: Steven Spielberg, for Schindler's List
 Best International Actor: Tom Hanks, for Forrest Gump
 Best International Actress: Sandra Bullock, for Speed

18th Jupiter Award / 1996 
 Best International Film: Apollo 13, directed by Ron Howard
 Best International Director: Mel Gibson, for Braveheart
 Best International Actor: Johnny Depp, for Don Juan DeMarco
 Best International Actress: Sandra Bullock, for While You Were Sleeping

19th Jupiter Award / 1997 
 Best International Film: Independence Day, directed by Roland Emmerich
 Best International Director: Roland Emmerich, for Independence Day
 Best International Actor: Nicolas Cage, for Leaving Las Vegas / The Rock
 Best International Actress: Sandra Bullock, for A Time to Kill / The Net

20th Jupiter Award / 1998 
 Best International Film: Face/Off, directed by John Woo
 Best International Director: John Woo, for Face/Off
 Best International Actor: Nicolas Cage, for Con Air / Face/Off
 Best International Actress: Jodie Foster, for Contact

21st Jupiter Award / 1999 
 Best International Film: Titanic, directed by James Cameron
 Best International Director: James Cameron, for Titanic
 Best International Actor: Jack Nicholson, for As Good as It Gets
 Best International Actress: Kate Winslet, for Titanic

22nd Jupiter Award / 2000 
 Best International Film: The Matrix, directed by The Wachowskis
 Best International Director: The Wachowskis, for The Matrix
 Best International Actor: Edward Norton, for Fight Club
 Best International Actress: Gwyneth Paltrow, for Shakespeare in Love

23rd Jupiter Award / 2001 
 Best International Film: American Beauty, directed by Sam Mendes
 Best International Director: Ridley Scott, for Gladiator
 Best International Actor: Kevin Spacey, for American Beauty
 Best International Actress: Julia Roberts, for Erin Brockovich
 Best German Actress: Franka Potente, for The Princess and the Warrior

24th Jupiter Award / 2002 
 Best International Film: Shrek, directed by Andrew Adamson and Vicky Jenson
 Best International Director: Ridley Scott, for Hannibal
 Best International Actor: Tom Hanks, for Cast Away
 Best International Actress: Julia Roberts, for The Mexican
 Best German Actor: Moritz Bleibtreu, for Das Experiment
 Best German TV Film: The Tunnel, directed by Roland Suso Richter

25th Jupiter Award / 2003 
 Best International Film: The Lord of the Rings: The Fellowship of the Ring, directed by Peter Jackson
 Best International Director: Peter Jackson, for The Lord of the Rings: The Fellowship of the Ring
 Best International Actor: Will Smith, for Ali
 Best International Actress: Halle Berry, for Monster's Ball

26th Jupiter Award / 2004 
 Best International Film: The Lord of the Rings: The Return of the King, directed by Peter Jackson
 Best International Director: Peter Jackson, for The Lord of the Rings: The Return of the King
 Best International Actor: Johnny Depp, for Pirates of the Caribbean: The Curse of the Black Pearl
 Best International Actress: Nicole Kidman, for Cold Mountain

27th Jupiter Award / 2005 
 Best International Film: The Day After Tomorrow, directed by Roland Emmerich
 Best International Director: Quentin Tarantino, for Kill Bill: Volume 2
 Best International Actor: Will Smith, for Hitch
 Best International Actress: Uma Thurman, for Kill Bill: Volume 1 / Kill Bill: Volume 2

28th Jupiter Award / 2006 
 Best International Film: Million Dollar Baby, directed by Clint Eastwood
 Best International Director: Clint Eastwood, for Million Dollar Baby
 Best International Actor: Jamie Foxx, for Ray
 Best International Actress: Hilary Swank, for Million Dollar Baby
 Best German Film: Sophie Scholl – The Final Days, directed by Marc Rothemund
 Best German Director: Marc Rothemund, for Sophie Scholl – The Final Days
 Best German Actor: Benno Fürmann, for Joyeux Noël
 Best German Actress: Julia Jentsch, for Sophie Scholl – The Final Days
 Best German TV Film: Speer und Er, directed by Heinrich Breloer
 Best German TV Actor: Christoph Maria Herbst, for Stromberg
 Best German TV Actress: Marie Bäumer, for Ein toter Bruder
 Best DVD Release: Edison, directed by David J. Burke

29th Jupiter Award / 2007 
 Best International Film: Casino Royale, directed by Martin Campbell
 Best International Director: Peter Jackson, for King Kong
 Best International Actor: Johnny Depp, for Pirates of the Caribbean: Dead Man's Chest
 Best International Actress: Audrey Tautou, for The Da Vinci Code
 Meryl Streep, for The Devil Wears Prada
 Anne Hathaway, for The Devil Wears Prada
 Best German Film: Perfume: The Story of a Murderer, directed by Tom Tykwer
 Best German Director: Tom Tykwer, for Perfume: The Story of a Murderer
 Best German Actor: Ulrich Mühe, for The Lives of Others
 Best German Actress: Martina Gedeck, for Atomised
 Best German TV Film: Dresden, directed by Roland Suso Richter
 Best German TV Actor: Benno Fürmann, for 
 Best German TV Actress: Nadja Uhl, for 
 Best DVD Release: The Jacket, directed by John Maybury

30th Jupiter Award / 2008 
 Best International Film: Ratatouille, directed by Brad Bird and Jan Pinkava
 Best International Director: Paul Greengrass, for The Bourne Ultimatum
 Best International Actor: Johnny Depp, for Pirates of the Caribbean: At World's End
 Best International Actress: Jodie Foster, for The Brave One
 Meryl Streep, for Mamma Mia!
 Amanda Seyfried, for Mamma Mia!
 Best German Film: Neues vom Wixxer, directed by Cyrill Boss and Philipp Stennert
 Best German Director: Michael Herbig, for Lissi und der wilde Kaiser
 Best German Actor: Til Schweiger, for Where Is Fred?
 Best German Actress: Nina Hoss, for Yella
 Best German TV Film: Die Frau vom Checkpoint Charlie, directed by Miguel Alexandre
 Best German TV Actor: Heino Ferch, for Die Mauer – Berlin '61
 Best German TV Actress: Maria Furtwängler, for March of Millions
 Best DVD Release: Lucky Number Slevin, directed by Paul McGuigan

31st Jupiter Award / 2009 
 Best International Film: The Dark Knight, directed by Christopher Nolan
 Best International Director: Sean Penn, for Into the Wild
 Best International Actor: Heath Ledger, for The Dark Knight
 Best International Actress: Penélope Cruz, for Vicky Cristina Barcelona
 Best German Film: Rabbit Without Ears, directed by Til Schweiger
 Best German Director: Dennis Gansel, for The Wave
 Best German Actor: Jürgen Vogel, for The Wave
 Best German Actress: Nora Tschirner, for Rabbit Without Ears
 Best German TV Film: , directed by Joseph Vilsmaier
 Best German TV Actor: Michael Mendl, for Der Besuch der alten Dame
 Best German TV Actress: Anja Kling, for Wir sind das Volk – Liebe kennt keine Grenzen
 Best DVD Release: Watching the Detectives, directed by Paul Soter
 Lifetime Achievement Award: Volker Schlöndorff

32nd Jupiter Award / 2010 
 Best International Film: Avatar, directed by James Cameron
 Best International Director: Quentin Tarantino, for Inglourious Basterds
 Best International Actor: Christoph Waltz, for Inglourious Basterds
 Best International Actress: Noomi Rapace, for The Girl with the Dragon Tattoo
 Meryl Streep, for Doubt
 Meryl Streep, for Julie & Julia
 Best German Film: Men in the City, directed by Simon Verhoeven
 Best German Director: Sönke Wortmann, for Pope Joan
 Best German Actor: David Kross, for Krabat
 Best German Actress: Johanna Wokalek, for Pope Joan
 Best German TV Film: 12 Winter, directed by Thomas Stiller
 Best German TV Actor: Matthias Schweighöfer, for 
 Best German TV Actress: Andrea Sawatzki, for 
 Best DVD Release: The Illusionist, directed by Neil Burger
 Lifetime Achievement Award: Otto Waalkes

33rd Jupiter Award / 2011 
 Best International Film: The Town, directed by Ben Affleck
 Best International Actor: Jeremy Renner, for The Town
 Best International Actress: Emily Blunt, for The Young Victoria
 Meryl Streep, for It's Complicated
 Best German Film: Vincent Wants to Sea, directed by 
 Best German Actor: Alexander Fehling, for Young Goethe in Love
 Best German Actress: Karoline Herfurth, for Vincent Wants to Sea
 Best German TV Film: , directed by Dieter Wedel
 Best German TV Actor: Jan Josef Liefers and Axel Prahl, for Tatort
 Best German TV Actress: Nina Kunzendorf, for Until Nothing Remains
 Best International TV Series: True Blood, by Alan Ball
 Best German TV Series: Mord mit Aussicht, by Marie Reiners
 Lifetime Achievement Award: Hardy Krüger

34th Jupiter Award / 2012

35th Jupiter Award / 2013 
 Best International Film: 
Skyfall, directed by Sam Mendes
Ted, directed by Seth MacFarlane
 Best International Actor: Tommy Lee Jones, for Hope Springs
 Best International Actress: Diane Kruger, for Farewell, My Queen
 Meryl Streep, for Hope Springs
 Meryl Streep, for The Iron Lady
 Best German Film: , directed by Florian David Fitz
 Best German Actor: Elyas M'Barek, for Heiter bis Wolkig
 Best German Actress: Luna Schweiger, for Guardians
 Best German TV Film: The Tower, directed by Christian Schwochow
 Best German TV Actor: Ronald Zehrfeld, for 
 Best German TV Actress: Maria Furtwängler, for Tatort
 Best International TV Series: Two and a Half Men
 Best German TV Series: Crime Scene Cleaner (Der Tatortreiniger)
 Lifetime Achievement Award: Jürgen Prochnow

36th Jupiter Award / 2014

37th Jupiter Award / 2015

38th Jupiter Award / 2016

39th Jupiter Award / 2017

40th Jupiter Award / 2018

41st Jupiter Award / 2019

42nd Jupiter Award / 2020

43rd Jupiter Award / 2021

44th Jupiter Award / 2022

See also
 Cinema of Germany
 List of German films

References

External links
  

German film awards
Awards established in 1979